Daniel Leonard Keczmer (born May 25, 1968) is an American former professional ice hockey player who played in the National Hockey League (NHL) for five teams between 1990 and 2000. Internationally he played for the American national team at two World Championships.

Biography
As a youth, he played in the 1981 Quebec International Pee-Wee Hockey Tournament with a minor ice hockey team from Detroit.

Keczmer played four seasons with Lake Superior State University and was a member of the Lake Superior State Lakers 1988 NCAA Championship men's ice hockey team.

He was drafted in the tenth round, 201st overall, by the Minnesota North Stars in the 1986 NHL Entry Draft. Keczmer made his professional debut with the IHL's Kalamazoo Wings in the 1990–91 season. He also appeared in nine NHL games with the North Stars that same season.

Keczmer was one of many North Stars who joined the San Jose Sharks in the 1991 NHL Dispersal Draft. Before the Sharks' inaugural season began, however, Keczmer was traded to the Hartford Whalers in exchange for Dean Evason. Keczmer would play with the Whalers, Calgary Flames, Dallas Stars, and Nashville Predators before retiring following the 1999–2000 season.

In his NHL career, Keczmer appeared in 235 games. He scored eight goals and added 38 assists. He also appeared in 12 Stanley Cup playoff games, recording one assist.

He now resides in Brentwood, Tennessee with his family.

Career statistics

Regular season and playoffs

International

Awards and honors

References

External links
 

1968 births
Living people
Albany River Rats players
American men's ice hockey defensemen
Calgary Flames players
Dallas Stars players
Hartford Whalers players
Ice hockey players from Michigan
Kalamazoo Wings (1974–2000) players
Lake Superior State Lakers men's ice hockey players
Milwaukee Admirals (IHL) players
Minnesota North Stars draft picks
Minnesota North Stars players
Nashville Predators players
NCAA men's ice hockey national champions
People from Mount Clemens, Michigan
Saint John Flames players
Sportspeople from Metro Detroit
Springfield Indians players
Worcester IceCats players